"" ("My Motherland") is the regional anthem of Gagauzia, an autonomous territorial unit of Moldova. It was composed by Mihail Colsa in 1995, and the lyrics were written by Mina Kosä. It was officially adopted by the People's Assembly of Gagauzia in 1999.

Lyrics

Notes

References

National anthems
European anthems
Regional songs
Gagauzia
National anthem compositions in D minor